Cope's tree frog may refer to:

 Cope's brown treefrog (Ecnomiohyla miliaria), a frog in the family Hylidae found in Costa Rica, Nicaragua, and Panama
 Cope's eastern Paraguay tree frog (Hypsiboas polytaenius), a frog in the family Hylidae endemic to Brazil
 Cope's gray tree frog (Hyla chrysoscelis), a frog in the family Hylidae found in the United States

See also
 Cope's frog, Hylarana leptoglossa